

Alois Weber (26 July 1903 – 19 June 1976) was a general in the Wehrmacht of Nazi Germany. He was a recipient of the Knight's Cross of the Iron Cross with Oak Leaves.

Awards and decorations
 Iron Cross (1939)  2nd Class (28 September 1939) &1st Class (28 November 1939)
 Knight's Cross of the Iron Cross with Oak Leaves
 Knight's Cross on 26 November 1941 as Major and commander of I./Infanterie-Regiment 19
 579th Oak Leaves on 10 September 1944 as Oberst and commander of Grenadier-Regiment 61

References

Citations

Bibliography

 
 

1903 births
1976 deaths
Major generals of the German Army (Wehrmacht)
Recipients of the Knight's Cross of the Iron Cross with Oak Leaves
German Army generals of World War II
Military personnel from Bavaria